Louis-Joseph Labrosse (June 20, 1872 – after 1908) was an Ontario notary and political figure. He represented Prescott in the Legislative Assembly of Ontario from 1905 to 1908.

He was born in 1872 in St. Eugene, the son of Simon Labrosse. Labrosse was educated in Montreal and at the Ottawa Business College. In 1892, he married Yvonne Bourque. He served as postmaster at St. Eugene. He defeated François-Eugène-Alfred Évanturel to win the Prescott seat in 1905; he was defeated by Georges Pharand in 1908.

References

External links

1872 births
Franco-Ontarian people
Ontario Liberal Party MPPs
Year of death missing